Justice French may refer to:

C. G. W. French (1822–1891), chief justice of the Arizona Territorial Supreme Court
Christopher French (judge) (1925–2003), judge of the English High Court of Justice
George W. French (1823–1887), associate justice of the South Dakota Supreme Court
John French (judge) (1670–1728), associate justice of the Delaware Supreme Court
Judith L. French (born 1962), associate justice of the Ohio Supreme Court
Robert French (born 1947), chief justice of the Supreme Court of Australia
Walter M. French (1874–1930), associate justice of the Washington Supreme Court